is a Kofun period burial mound located in the Nishi-Ōmuro neighborhood of what is now the city of Takasaki, Gunma Prefecture in the northern Kantō region of Japan. It was designated a National Historic Site of Japan in 1927. It is estimated to have been built around  beginning of the 6th century AD and is part of a group of at least six tumuli which were concentrated in the vicinity, forming the Ōmuro Kofun Cluster. Within the Ōmuro Kofun Cluster are also the Maefutago Kofun and the Ushirofutago Kofun, which have a separate National Historic Site designations.

Overview
The tumulus is located on a low hill at the southern foot of Mount Akagi. It is the largest in the Ōmuro Kofun Cluster with a total length of 111 meters, with a posterior circular portion in two tiers and an anterior rectangular portion two tiers, and is orientated to 89 degrees northeast. Part of the mound is carved out of the ground, and only the upper tier was originally covered in fukiishi. Cylindrical, house-shaped and other types of haniwa were also excavated in profusion, and it is estimated that originally over 3000 haniwa were in rows on the mounds. The tumulus is surrounded by a shield-shaped double moat with crossings on the north and west sides. Although excavated in March 1891, no burial chamber was discovered.

Total length 111 meters 
Anterior rectangular portion 79 meters wide, 2-tier
Posterior circular portion 66 meter diameter x 15 meters high, 2-tier

See also
List of Historic Sites of Japan (Gunma)

References

External links
 
Gunma Prefecture tourism site 
Maebashi City guide 

Kofun
History of Gunma Prefecture
Maebashi
Archaeological sites in Japan
Historic Sites of Japan